Bahurani may refer to:

 Bahurani (1940 film), a 1940 Bollywood film
 Bahurani (1963 film), a 1963 Indian Hindi film directed by T. Prakash Rao
 Bahurani (1989 film), a 1989 family-drama Indian Hindi film directed by Manik Chatterjee